A foreign national wishing to enter Paraguay must obtain a visa unless they are citizens of one of the eligible visa exempt countries or countries whose citizens are granted visa on arrival. Paraguay visas are documents issued by the Ministry of Foreign Affairs and its subsequent diplomatic missions abroad; with the stated goal of regulating and facilitating migratory flows.

Visa policy map

Visa exemption 
Holders of passports of the following 65 jurisdictions do not require a visa to enter Paraguay for up to 90 days (unless otherwise noted) if holding a valid passport.

ID - may also travel with an ID card.
1 – including all classes of British nationality.
2 - up to 30 days.
3 - up to 60 days.

Non-ordinary passports

Holders of diplomatic or official/service passports of Cuba, Egypt, India, Indonesia, Jordan, Lebanon, Morocco, Philippines, Vatican City and Vietnam do not require a visa.

Visa on arrival
Citizens of the following countries can obtain a visa on arrival for a maximum stay of 30 days.

See also

Visa requirements for Paraguayan citizens

References

External links 
Paraguayan Ministry of Foreign Affairs (Spanish)
Visa information for Paraguay (Spanish)
Visa on arrival to Paraguay

Paraguay
Foreign relations of Paraguay